The softball throw is a track and field event used as a substitute for more technical throwing events in competitions involving Youth, Paralympic, Special Olympics and Senior competitors.

The general rules for the softball throw parallel those of the javelin throw when conducted in a formal environment, but the implement being thrown is a standard softball, which resembles the size of a standard shot but is considerably lighter.

The event was one of the standardized test events as part of the President's Award on Physical Fitness. It is an official event for ages 9–12 in the Hershey Youth track and field program.  Other meets include it as a beginners event.  It is a youth event for the World Dwarf Games.

Certain divisions of the Special Olympics throw a softball, specified in the rules as having a 30 cm circumference. Some divisions do a similar ball throw using a tennis ball.

While it is not in the official National championship program, it is often part of local senior competitions.  Some competitions introduce a factor for accuracy.

References

Events in track and field
Throwing sports